Rivers of Japan are characterized by their relatively short lengths and considerably steep gradients due to the narrow and mountainous topography of the country. An often-cited quote is 'this is not a river, but a waterfall' by the Dutch engineer (o-yatoi gaikokujin) Johannis de Rijke who had visited the Jōganji River, Toyama Prefecture. The Mogami, the Fuji and the Kuma are regarded as the three most rapid rivers of Japan.

Typical rivers of Japan rise from mountainous forests and cut out deep V-shaped valleys in their upper reaches, and form alluvial plains in their lower reaches which enable the Japanese to cultivate rice fields and to set up cities. Most rivers are dammed to supply both water and electricity.

The longest river of Japan is the Shinano, which flows from Nagano to Niigata. The Tone has the largest watershed and serves water to more than 30 million inhabitants of Tokyo metropolitan area.

List of rivers in Japan

The list below is in geographical order (from north to south). See also :Category:Rivers of Japan for an alphabetical list.

Hokkaidō
There are 326 rivers in Hokkaido including 13 class A river systems (1級水系 Ikkyū suikei) designated by the central government. See also :Category:Rivers of Hokkaido.

Class A rivers 
There are 13 class A river systems as follows. Their tributaries are also listed.

Class B rivers 
The rivers that are classified as class B rivers.

List of rivers in Hokkaidō by length
The following table is a list of rivers of Hokkaidō by length.

Honshu

Tōhoku 
First class rivers under the control of Tohoku Regional Bureau (東北地方整備局)
Iwaki River (岩木川) - Aomori
 Takase River (高瀬川) - Aomori
Mabechi River (馬淵川) - Iwate, Aomori
Kitakami River (北上川) - Iwate, Miyagi
Naruse River (鳴瀬川) - Miyagi
 Natori River (名取川) - Miyagi
Abukuma River (阿武隈川) - Miyagi, Fukushima
Yoneshiro River (米代川) - Akita, Iwate
Omono River (雄物川) - Akita
 Koyoshi River (子吉川) - Akita
 Mogami River (最上川) - Yamagata
 Aka River (赤川) - Yamagata

Second class river
Oirase River (奥入瀬川)

Aikawa River (Miyagi, Japan)

Kantō 
First class rivers under the control of Kanto Regional Bureau (関東地方整備局)
 Kuji-gawa (久慈川) - Fukushima, Ibaraki
 Naka-gawa (那珂川) - Tochigi, Ibaraki
Tone-gawa (利根川) - largest drainage area, and second longest of Japan; Gunma, Nagano, Tochigi, Saitama, Tokyo, Chiba, Ibaraki
Edo-gawa (江戸川)
Arakawa (荒川) - Saitama, Tokyo
Sumida-gawa (隅田川)
Kanda-gawa (神田川)
Tama-gawa (多摩川) - Yamanashi, Tokyo, Kanagawa
Tsurumi-gawa (鶴見川) - Tokyo, Kanagawa
Sagami-gawa (相模川) - Yamanashi, Kanagawa
 Fuji-kawa (富士川) - Nagano, Yamanashi, Shizuoka

Hokuriku 
First-class rivers under the control of Hokuriku Regional Bureau (北陸地方整備局)
 Ara River (荒川) - Yamagata, Niigata
 Agano River (阿賀野川) - Fukushima, Gunma, Niigata
 Shinano River (信濃川) - Nagano, Gunma, Niigata
 Seki River (関川) - Nagano, Niigata
 Hime River (姫川) - Nagano, Niigata
 Kurobe River (黒部川) - Toyama
 Jōganji River (常願寺川) - Toyama
 Jinzū River (神通川) - Gifu, Toyama
 Shō River (庄川) - Gifu, Toyama
 Oyabe River (小矢部川) - Ishikawa, Toyama
 Tedori River (手取川) - Ishikawa
 Kakehashi River (梯川) - Ishikawa

Chūbu 

Rivers that flow into the Sea of Japan:

Agano-gawa (阿賀野川) - Niigata, Fukushima, Gunma
Shinano-gawa (信濃川) or Chikuma-gawa (千曲川) - longest of Japan
Seki-kawa (関川) - Nagano, Niigata
Hime-kawa (姫川) - Nagano, Niigata
Kurobe-gawa (黒部川) - Toyama
Jōganji-gawa (常願寺川) - Toyama
Jinzū-gawa (神通川) - Gifu, Toyama
Shō-gawa (庄川) - Gifu, Toyama
Oyabe-gawa (小矢部川) - Toyama, Ishikawa
Tedori-gawa (手取川) - Ishikawa
Kuzuryū-gawa (九頭竜川) - Gifu, Fukui

Rivers that flow into the Pacific Ocean:

Fuji-kawa (富士川) - Nagano, Yamanashi, Shizuoka
Abe-kawa (安倍川) - Shizuoka
Ōi-gawa (大井川) - Shizuoka
Sakawa River (酒匂川) - Shizuoka, Kanagawa
Tenryū-gawa (天竜川) - Nagano, Aichi, Shizuoka
Toyo-gawa (豊川) - Aichi
Yahagi-gawa (矢作川) - Nagano, Gifu, Aichi
Shōnai-gawa (庄内川) - Gifu, Aichi
Kiso-gawa (木曽川) - Nagano, Gifu, Aichi, Mie
Nagara-gawa (長良川) - Gifu, Aichi, Mie
Ibi-gawa (揖斐川) -Gifu, Mie
Kushida-gawa (櫛田川) - Mie
Miya-gawa (宮川) - Mie

First class rivers under control of Chubu Regional Bureau (中部地方整備局)
 Kano-gawa (狩野川) - Shizuoka
 Abe-kawa (安倍川) - Shizuoka
Ōi-gawa (大井川) - Shizuoka
 Kiku-gawa (菊川) - Shizuoka
Tenryū-gawa (天竜川) - Nagano, Aichi, Shizuoka
Toyo-gawa (豊川) - Aichi
Yahagi-gawa (矢作川) - Nagano, Gifu, Aichi
Shōnai-gawa (庄内川) - Gifu, Aichi
Kiso-gawa (木曽川) - Nagano, Gifu, Shiga, Aichi, Mie
 Suzuka-gawa (鈴鹿川) - Mie
 Kumozu-gawa (雲出川) - Mie
 Kushida-gawa (櫛田川) - Mie
 Miya-gawa (宮川) - Mie

Kansai 
The first class rivers under the control of Kinki Regional Bureau (近畿地方整備局)
 Kuzuryu-gawa (九頭竜川) - Fukui
 Kita-gawa (北川) - Shiga, Fukui
 Yura-gawa (由良川) - Hyogo, Kyoto
Yodo-gawa (淀川), Seta-gawa (瀬田川) or Uji-gawa (宇治川)
Yasu-gawa (野洲川)
Katsura-gawa (桂川), Hozu-gawa (保津川) or Ōi-gawa (大堰川)
Kamo-gawa (鴨川)
Kizu-gawa (木津川)
Dōton-bori (道頓堀)
Yamato-gawa (大和川) - Nara, Osaka
 Maruyama-gawa (円山川) - Hyogo
 Kako-gawa (加古川) - Hyogo
 Ibo-gawa (揖保川) - Hyogo
 Ki-no-kawa (紀ノ川, 紀の川) - Nara, Wakayama
 Yamato-gawa (大和川) - Nara, Osaka
 Kumano-gawa (熊野川) or Shingu-gawa (新宮川) - Nara, Mie, Wakayama

The second class river	
Muko-gawa (武庫川)

Chūgoku 
There are 13 Class A river systems in Chūgoku Region, which are under control of Chugoku Regional Bureau (中国地方整備局). See also :Category:Rivers of Tottori Prefecture, :Category:Rivers of Shimane Prefecture, :Category:Rivers of Hiroshima Prefecture, :Category:Rivers of Okayama Prefecture and :Category:Rivers of Yamaguchi Prefecture.

Sendai River (千代川) - Tottori
Tenjin River (天神川) - Tottori
Hino River (日野川) - Tottori
Hii River (斐伊川) - Shimane, Tottori
Gō-no-kawa, or Gō-gawa (江の川, 江川) - Hiroshima, Shimane
Takatsu River (高津川) - Shimane
Yoshii River (吉井川) - Okayama
Asahi River (旭川) - Okayama 
Takahashi River (高梁川) - Hiroshima, Okayama
Ashida River (芦田川) - Okayama, Hiroshima
Ōta-gawa (太田川) - Hiroshima
Oze River (小瀬川) - Hiroshima, Yamaguchi
Saba River (佐波川) - Yamaguchi

Shikoku 
First class rivers under control of Shikoku Regional Bureau (四国地方整備局)
Yoshino-gawa (吉野川) - Kochi, Ehime, Tokushima, Kagawa
 Naka-gawa (那賀川) - Tokushima
 Doki-gawa (土器川) - Kagawa
 Shigenobu-gawa (重信川) - Ehime
 Hiji-kawa (肱川) - Ehime
 Monobe-kawa (物部川) - Kochi 	6
 Niyodo-gawa (仁淀川) - Ehime, Kochi
Shimanto-gawa (四万十川) - Ehime, Kochi

Kyūshū 
First class rivers under control of Kyushu Regional Bureau (九州地方整備局)

 Onga-gawa (遠賀川) - Fukuoka
 Yamakuni-gawa (山国川) - Oita, Fukuoka
Chikugo-gawa (筑後川) - Kumamoto, Oita, Fukuoka, Saga
 Yabe-gawa (矢部川) - Fukuoka
 Matsuura-gawa (松浦川) - Saga
 Rokkaku-gawa (六角川) - Saga
 Kase-gawa (嘉瀬川) - Saga 
 Honmyo-gawa (本明川) - Nagasaki
 Kikuchi-gawa (菊池川) - Kumamoto
 Shira-kawa (白川) - Kumamoto
 Midori-gawa (緑川) - Kumamoto
Kuma-gawa (球磨川) - Kumamoto
 Ōita-gawa (大分川) - Ōita
 Ōno-gawa (大野川) - Kumamoto, Miyazaki, Ōita
 Banjo-gawa (番匠川) - Ōita
 Gokase-gawa (五ヶ瀬川) - Kumamoto, Ōita, Miyazaki
 Omaru-gawa (小丸川) - Miyazaki
 Ōyodo-gawa (大淀川) - Kagoshima, Kumamoto, Miyazaki
 Sendai-gawa (川内川) - Miyazaki, Kagoshima
 Kimotsuki-gawa (肝属川, 肝付川) - Kagoshima

See also 
Geography of Japan

References

 全国１０９の一級水系 (109 of first class rivers; by Ministry of Land, Infrastructure and Transport, Japan)
 一級水系の河川整備基本方針策定状況（平成21年3月6日現在）(you can see where first class rivers are)

External links

 Rivers of Japan - Ministry of Land, Infrastructure, Transport and Tourism

Japan
Rivers